Brighton John Diggins (born Bryton John Diggins, 26 December 1906 – 14 July 1971) was an Australian rules footballer in the West Australian Football League (WAFL) and Victorian Football League (VFL).

Family
The son of Arthur Oswald Diggins (1878–1933) and Lucy Dolphin "Dolly" Diggins (1886–1945), née Mountain, Diggins was born on 26 December 1906. He married Amanda Eileen Murphy in 1928. He died on 14 July 1971.

Subiaco
Diggins began his senior football career at the Subiaco Football Club in the West Australian Football League in 1927. A key position player and ruckman, Diggins was a strong mark and a fast runner, and by 1930, he was considered to be the finest key position player in Australia. He played with Subiaco from 1927 to 1931, and played 88 matches for the Lions.

South Melbourne
In 1932, during the Great Depression, Diggins moved to Victoria to play for the South Melbourne Football Club in the VFL.

Diggins was one of several Subiaco players who joined South Melbourne in the early 1930s, including Johnny Leonard (who was coaching), Bill Faul and John Bowe, with the promise of immediate, long-term, secure, paid employment outside of football within the (137 store) grocery empire of the South Melbourne president, South Melbourne Lord Mayor, and Member of the Victorian Legislative Council, Archie Crofts.

The influx of players from interstate became known as South Melbourne's "Foreign Legion", and helped South's on-field performance significantly. Diggins won one premiership with South Melbourne in 1933, and played there until 1937.

Carlton
Having been denied the opportunity to coach at South Melbourne, Diggins reluctantly moved to the Carlton Football Club in 1938, and was appointed captain-coach — he had been denied a transfer to Carlton a year earlier.

He flourished at Carlton. In his first season, he led the team to the 1938 premiership. He played two more seasons with Carlton, He played his last senior game in round four (18 May 1940) against Melbourne, when he suffered a serious injury to a knuckle. Due to that injury, and number of illnesses, he did not play for Carlton again that year, on medical advice; however he did continue as non-playing coach until the end of the 1940 season (round 18: 31 August 1940).

Military service
Having earlier intimated an inclination to enlist in the R.A.A.F., once Carlton's 1940 VFL season had finished, Diggins enlisted in the Second AIF (in September 1940).
"Diggins retired [from football] in order to join the armed forces. However, after just three months he was discharged on medical grounds when it was felt that his ankle, which he had injured in a match in 1934, would be unable to withstand the rigours of infantry training."

He re-enlisted in 1942; and, as Staff Sergeant Diggins, he took an active part in the training of commandos at the Army Physical and Recreational Training School (P. & R.T.) in Frankston.

Frankston
In 1947, he was appointed non-playing coach of Frankston Football Club. In September 1947, when an injured player was unable to return to the field after half-time, he "took the field [and] received a great ovation from the Frankston supporters. Diggins is the biggest man seen in Peninsular football for a long time. "Football News" put his weight down at 17 stone [viz., 108kg]". and, in the following season (1948), aged 41, he made another comeback, in which "he played inspiring football and was largely responsible for his side's two-goal win". He coached Frankston for three seasons (1947–1949).

The Argus
In 1950, he became a football reporter for The Argus.

Subiaco Team of the Century
Diggins was named as the centre half-back in the Subiaco Team of the Century.

Notes

References
 Devaney, J., "Brighton Diggins", Australian Football, australianfootball.com, n.d.

External links

 Brighton Diggins at Blueseum
 
 Brighton John Diggins, WAFL Footy Facts.
 Boyles Football Photos: Brighton Diggins.
 World War Two Service Record: Diggins, Brighton John (VX38178): Enlistment date, 9 September 1940; Date of discharge 2 December 1940.
 World War Two Service Record: Diggins, Brighton John (V147355): Enlistment date, 3 March 1942; Date of discharge 20 October 1943.
 Find A Grave: John Brighton Diggins.

1906 births
Australian rules footballers from Perth, Western Australia
Sydney Swans players
Sydney Swans Premiership players
Sydney Swans coaches
Carlton Football Club players
Carlton Football Club Premiership players
Carlton Football Club coaches
Carlton Football Club Premiership coaches
Subiaco Football Club players
1971 deaths
Two-time VFL/AFL Premiership players
Australian Army personnel of World War II
Australian Army soldiers
One-time VFL/AFL Premiership coaches
Military personnel from Western Australia